Fussball Club Diepoldsau-Schmitter is a football team from Switzerland which has been playing in the swiss 3. liga.

History

Current squad

Staff and board members
 Trainer:Mischko Rankovic
 Physio: Michaela Wüst
 President: Roman Müller
 Vice President: Adrian Spirig
 Groundsman:Romeo Schmid

Stadium

External links
  Official Website

Association football clubs established in 1951
Diepoldsau Schmitter
1951 establishments in Switzerland